The 12090 / 89 Shivamogga Town Yesvantpur Jan Shatabdi Express is a Superfast express train of the Jan Shatabdi Express series belonging to Indian Railways - South Western Railway zone that runs between Shivamogga Town and Bangalore City railway station in India.

It operates as train number 12090 from Shivamogga Town to Bangalore City railway station and as train number 12089 in the reverse direction serving the state of Karnataka.

It is among the latest trains introduced in the Jan Shatabdi Express series which were originally started by the then railway minister of India Mr. Nitish Kumar during the 2002 – 03 railway budget.

Coaches

The 12090 / 89 Shivamogga Town Yesvantpur Jan Shatabdi Express has 2 AC Chair Car, 8 2nd Class seating and 2 End on Generator Coaches. It does not carry a Pantry car coach

As is customary with most train services in India, Coach Composition may be amended at the discretion of Indian Railways depending on demand.

Service

Routeing

The 12090 / 89 Shivamogga Town Yesvantpur Jan Shatabdi Express runs from Shivamogga Town via Bhadravati, Kadur Junction, Tumakuru to Yesvantpur Junction.

Traction

As the entire route is fully electrified, a Lallaguda-based WAP-7(HOG Equipped) powers the train for its entire journey.

Operation

The 12090 / 89 Shivamogga Town Yesvantpur Jan Shatabdi Express runs 6 days a week in both directions (except Tuesday)

References 

 https://swr.indianrailways.gov.in/view_detail.jsp?lang=0&id=0,4,268&dcd=2582&did=1549869780160B21ACC4FAA723E3E8A6B4CD4953A1E15 
 https://erail.in/jan-shatabdi-trains-list/a/60004
 https://swr.indianrailways.gov.in/view_detail.jsp?lang=0&id=0,4,268&dcd=2654&did=15525506473268F79B9CCB3EFBB28DD9506030638E4F5

External links

 https://swr.indianrailways.gov.in/view_detail.jsp?lang=0&id=0,4,268&dcd=2582&did=1549869780160B21ACC4FAA723E3E8A6B4CD4953A1E15  
 https://swr.indianrailways.gov.in/view_detail.jsp?lang=0&id=0,4,268&dcd=2654&did=15525506473268F79B9CCB3EFBB28DD9506030638E4F5

Jan Shatabdi Express trains
Rail transport in Karnataka
Railway services introduced in 2019